Terrance Quinn (born July 15, 1952), known professionally as Terry O'Quinn, is an American actor.  He played John Locke on the TV series Lost, the title role in The Stepfather and Stepfather II, and Peter Watts in Millennium, which ran for three seasons (1996–1999). He has also hosted Mysteries of the Missing on The Science Channel. For his role in Lost, he won the Emmy Award for Outstanding Supporting Actor in a Drama Series.

Early life
O'Quinn was born at War Memorial Hospital in Sault Ste. Marie, Michigan, one of 11 siblings, and grew up in nearby Newberry, Michigan. He is of Irish descent, and was raised Catholic. He attended Central Michigan University in Mount Pleasant, Michigan, and the University of Iowa in Iowa City. He changed his surname from Quinn to O'Quinn as another registered actor already had the name Terrance Quinn.

In the 1970s, he went to Baltimore to act in the Center Stage production of Tartuffe.  He remained at Center Stage for some years and often appeared with the late Tana Hicken, most notably as Benedick to her Beatrice in Much Ado About Nothing.  His first movie role was in Heaven's Gate.

Career
O'Quinn began acting in the 1970s during his time at Central Michigan University. He not only was an actor but also playwright/director. He wrote and directed the musical Orchestrina. This musical featured five main characters: The Man (played by Jeff Daniels), The Boy (Harold Downs), The Woman (Ann O'Donnell), The Girl (Debbie Penwarden), and The Drunk (James Hilliker), plus a female and a male chorus. He was roommates at CMU with actor Brad Slaight.

Starting in 1980, O'Quinn has appeared in various feature films such as Silver Bullet, Tombstone, Heaven's Gate, Young Guns, alongside Rutger Hauer in Blind Fury, and as Howard Hughes in The Rocketeer.

O'Quinn also appeared in the Canadian horror movie, Pin (1988) alongside British-born Canadian actor, David Hewlett.

His early television roles include guest appearances on  Tales of the unexpected (episode "in the bag"), Miami Vice (episode "Give a Little, Take a Little"), Moonlighting, Star Trek: The Next Generation (episode "The Pegasus"), The Twilight Zone (1985 revival; episode "Chameleon"), Homicide: Life on the Street (episode "Hate Crimes"), a recurring role on Earth 2, another recurring role as Captain (later Rear Admiral) Thomas Boone on JAG, as well as Colonel Will Ryan in episode 15 of season 1 on the JAG spin-off series NCIS (episode "Enigma").

Around 1995, O'Quinn made guest appearances in The X-Files and Harsh Realm, produced by Chris Carter, who also cast him in the film The X-Files: Fight The Future and then once again in the final season. In 1996 O'Quinn started acting in the television series Millennium as Peter Watts, also produced by Chris Carter.  O'Quinn held this role for all three seasons of the series. O'Quinn holds the distinction of having played four different characters within the extended X-Files/Millennium continuum (the two shows being classed together since both Lance Henriksen's character of Frank Black and Charles Nelson Reilly's character of Jose Chung have appeared in both shows).

The Stepfather films

O'Quinn made his breakthrough by starring as the title character in The Stepfather, a deranged serial killer going by the name "Jerry Blake" (his character's real name and identity are never revealed), who is obsessed with having an ideal family. When a widowed mother and daughter do not comport with his expectations, he spirals into a spell of madness and attempts to brutally murder them. O'Quinn was praised by critics, including Roger Ebert in the Chicago Sun-Times, who commented, "The Stepfather has one wonderful element: Terry O'Quinn's performance." Ebert wrote, "He is a journeyman actor from TV and many movies, usually in supporting roles, and you may or may not recognize him. What's clear at once is that he is a strong actor, and given this leading role he brings all kinds of creepy dimensions to it. He has the thankless assignment of showing us a completely hateful, repellent character – and he approaches the task as an exercise in cloying middle-class good manners." O'Quinn was nominated for both a Saturn Award and an Independent Spirit Award for his performance.  A sequel, Stepfather II, was released two years later, in which his character escapes from an insane asylum. It grossed almost a million dollars less at the box office. Not impressed with the second movie, O'Quinn declined to appear in the third installment, in which the stepfather character was portrayed by Robert Wightman.

O'Quinn was approached by director of the 2009 reboot of The Stepfather, Nelson McCormick, to make a cameo appearance in the film, but according to the producers O'Quinn turned down the offer.

Lost

After a string of recurring appearances on Alias (2002–2003), as the FBI Director Kendall, O'Quinn became a favorite of television producer J.J. Abrams. Following a seven-episode guest run on The West Wing in 2003–2004, O'Quinn received a call from Abrams indicating that the producer wanted to cast him in his new television drama Lost without any audition. In 2005 O'Quinn received an Emmy nomination for Best Supporting Actor in a Drama for his work as John Locke on the series Lost. O'Quinn admitted on the TV Guide Channel that he did not have much faith in Lost at first, calling it "The Mysterious Gilligan's Island of Dr. Moreau". The show, however, became one of the most popular on television, and on September 16, 2007, he won an Emmy Award for Outstanding Supporting Actor In A Drama Series for his role, and was nominated again for an Emmy for the role in 2010, which he did not win. In a TV.com interview O'Quinn commented that the reason he felt comfortable playing this character is because he's a bit like him.

 2010–present 
O'Quinn has made a number of television appearances since Lost. From 2012–2013, O'Quinn starred in the short-lived series 666 Park Avenue as Gavin Doran. In 2012, he appeared in the second season of Falling Skies. Additionally, O’Quinn starred for two seasons in Amazon Studios' Patriot. 

In 2016, it was announced that O'Quinn would be joining the second season of Secret and Lies. In 2019, O'Quinn starred in the only season of Perpetual Grace, LTD on Epix.

In February 2021, it was announced that O'Quinn was cast as Martin Queller in the upcoming Netflix thriller series Pieces of Her'', which is adapted from the Karin Slaughter novel of the same name.

Volunteer work 
Terry joined the Cameo platform shortly after its launch in 2017. He has since been creating videos for fans and donating all of the proceeds to the Virginia Beach SPCA. Terry has raised thousands of dollars on Cameo, and continues to create videos weekly.

Filmography

Film

Television

References

External links
 
 

1952 births
Living people
People from Reistertown, Maryland
People from Newberry, Michigan
People from Mount Pleasant, Michigan
People from Sault Ste. Marie, Michigan
American people of Irish descent
Male actors from Michigan
American male film actors
American male television actors
Central Michigan University alumni
Outstanding Performance by a Supporting Actor in a Drama Series Primetime Emmy Award winners
University of Iowa alumni
Catholics from Michigan
Catholics from Maryland